Edgewood is an unincorporated community in Isanti Township, Isanti County, Minnesota, United States.

The community is located between the cities of Cambridge and Isanti at the junction of State Highway 65 (MN 65) and old Highway 65.  Davenport Street is one of the main routes in the community.  Florence Lake is nearby to the east.  Local business establishments include a gas station.  Edgewood's motto is Little pine in the middle.

Infrastructure

Transportation
  MN 65

References

 Rand McNally Road Atlas – 2007 edition – Minnesota entry
 Official State of Minnesota Highway Map – 2013/2014 edition

Unincorporated communities in Minnesota
Unincorporated communities in Isanti County, Minnesota